Nick Green is a Canadian actor and playwright. He won the Dora Mavor Moore Award for Outstanding New Play in 2017 for his play Body Politic, a dramatization of the history of the Canadian LGBTQ newsmagazine The Body Politic.

A graduate of the University of Alberta, his prior plays have included Gayface, On the Wire, Undercovered, Coffee Dad, Chicken Mom and the Fabulous Buddha Boy, Under the Big Top, and Bearded Lady.

His play Dinner with the Duchess premiered at Toronto's Factory Theatre as part of the 2019 Next Stage Theatre Festival.

In 2020, after a production of his newest play was cancelled due to the COVID-19 pandemic, Green launched Social Distancing Festival, a website where arts professionals can share works online.

References

External links 
Social Distancing Festival

21st-century Canadian male actors
21st-century Canadian dramatists and playwrights
Canadian male dramatists and playwrights
Canadian male stage actors
Canadian gay writers
Canadian gay actors
Male actors from Edmonton
Writers from Edmonton
University of Alberta alumni
Living people
21st-century Canadian male writers
Year of birth missing (living people)
Dora Mavor Moore Award winners
21st-century Canadian LGBT people